The Chincha Islands are a group of three small islands  off the southwest coast of Peru, to which they belong, near the town of Pisco. Since pre-Incan times they were of interest for their extensive guano deposits, but the supplies were mostly exhausted by 1874.

Geography 

Isla Chincha Centro is almost the same size as its neighbour to the north, while Isla Chincha Sur is half the size of its neighbours. The islands are mostly granite, and bordered with cliffs on all sides, upon which great numbers of seabirds nest.

History 
The Chincha islands were once the residence of the Chincha people, but only a few remains are to be found today. Peru began the export of guano in 1840. Spain, not having recognized Peru's independence (it was not to do so until 1879) and desiring the guano profits, occupied the islands in April 1864, setting off the Chincha Islands War (1864–1866). 

The islands were featured in a 1854 book by American author George Washington Peck titled Melbourne, and the Chincha Islands: With Sketches of Lima, and a Voyage Round the World. The book chronicled Peck's time spent in the Australian city of Melbourne, as well as the Chincha Islands.

See also
 Chinese coolies in the Chincha Islands

References

External links

Islas Chincha (1865 map)
Islas Chincha 

Pacific islands of Peru
Guano trade
Landforms of Ica Region